A court of general jurisdiction is a court with authority to hear cases of all kinds – criminal, civil, family, probate, and so forth.

United States
All federal courts are courts of limited jurisdiction. Many U.S. states have divided their courts between criminal and civil, with some making further divisions, assigning probate, family law, and juvenile cases, for example, to specialized courts.

General jurisdiction and judicial immunity
One significant effect of the classification of a court is the liability that a judge from that court might face for stepping beyond the bounds of that court. Judges are able to claim judicial immunity for acts that are not completely beyond their jurisdiction. For example, if a probate judge were to sentence a person to jail, that judge would not have immunity and could be sued because a probate judge has no jurisdiction to effect a criminal sentence. However, a judge in a court of general jurisdiction who happened to be overseeing a probate case would be immune from suit for sending a party to jail, because handing down a criminal sentence is not completely beyond the jurisdiction of such a judge.

In the United States, this principle was established by the Supreme Court in Stump v. Sparkman, 435 U.S. 349 (1978). The Court found in that case that an Indiana judge was immune from a suit brought by a young woman whom the judge had ordered to be sterilized, at the behest of the woman's mother. Because the Indiana court was a court of general jurisdiction, and no law of Indiana expressly prohibited the judge from issuing such an order, the Supreme Court found that the order was not completely beyond the jurisdiction of that judge.

See also
 Limited jurisdiction
 Subject-matter jurisdiction
 Ordinary court

Jurisdiction